Basse-Goulaine is a commune in the Loire-Atlantique department in western France.

The commune is part of historical Brittany located in the Pays nantais (historical country) and in the Vignoble nantais (traditional country).

Population

See also
Communes of the Loire-Atlantique department

References

External links
Official site

Communes of Loire-Atlantique